The Kendriya Vidyalaya is a central government school in Hardoi that is instituted under the aegis of the Ministry of 
Human Resource Development. The literal of Kendriya Vidyalaya is "central school".

History

It is affiliated Central Board of Secondary Education, New Delhi. The school came into existence in 2015. This school belongs to one of world's largest chains of schools, Kendriya Vidyalayas.

Administration

The Kendriya Vidyalaya Sangathan, which literally translates to 'Central School Organisation', oversees the functioning of the school.

Shri Santosh Kumar Mall is the commissioner of the school. Shri Pulkit Khare (District Magistrate of Hardoi District) is the head of the thirteen membered Vidyalaya Management Committee of the school. Shrimati savitri devi is the principal of the school. Sanskrit is taught as a compulsory subject from class VI-VIII and for class 11th computer science is available and labs with all facility are available

References

Kendriya Vidyalayas
Kendriya Vidyalayas in Uttar Pradesh
2015 establishments in Uttar Pradesh
Educational institutions established in 2015
Hardoi